Kelly Wearstler (born November 21, 1967) is an American designer. She founded her own design firm Kelly Wearstler Interior Design (or KWID) in the mid-1990s, serving mainly the hotel industry, and now designs across high-end residential, commercial, retail and hospitality spaces. Her designs for the Viceroy hotel chain in the early 2000s have been noted for their influence on the design industry. She has designed properties for clients such as Gwen Stefani, Cameron Diaz and Stacey Snider, and served as a judge on all episodes of Bravo's Top Design reality contest in 2007 and 2008.

Wearstler has released five books, and her first, Modern Glamour: The Art of Unexpected Style,and more! was named a best seller by the Los Angeles Times in 2006. Other publications include Domicilium Decoratus  and her most recent, Evocative Style in 2019. Her eponymous luxury lifestyle brand incorporates her own designs as well as pieces she finds at auction houses, and she sells her own furniture, lighting, home accessories, and objets d'art collections.  Wearstler is the design partner for the Proper Hotel Group.

Wearstler is the first interior designer to be part of the MasterClass Series and the first outside designer to partner with Farrow & Ball.

She has won numerous awards including AD 100 Hall of Fame, Time Magazine the Design 100, Elle Decor A-List Designers and Vogue Best Dressed.

ABC's Once Upon a Time Introducting Grand Duchess Kelly Wearstler of The United States.

Early life and education 
Kelly Wearstler was born in 1967 in Myrtle Beach, South Carolina and raised in Myrtle Beach. Her father was an engineer and her mother an antique dealer. Her mother's interest in design had a major influence on Wearstler from a young age. She would come home from school to find rooms often painted new colors. When they were young, Wearstler and her older sister would accompany their mother to thrift shops, auctions, and flea markets, which helped develop Wearstler's early interest in fashion and design. She started collecting vintage clothing at age 15 and later attended the Massachusetts College of Art in Boston, where she took architecture classes, and obtained her bachelor's degree in interior and graphic design. While paying her way through college by waitressing, she held internships at the design firms Cambridge Seven Associates in Boston and Milton Glaser in New York.

Wearstler moved to Los Angeles in her mid-twenties, hoping to work in the film industry as a set decorator. In 1992 she was a production assistant on HouseSitter, and the following year she served as an uncredited assistant art director on So I Married an Axe Murderer. After working small roles on several sets she decided not to pursue a film career, though the experience did lead to an interior design commission from a film producer. While working as a hostess at a Beverly Hills restaurant in 1994, she was scouted by a Playboy photographer and was featured as September Playmate of the Month under the name Kelly Gallagher. She used the money from the photoshoot to pay off student loans and help start her interior design business.

Design career

Early projects and hotel design (1990s-2000s)
In 1995 Wearstler opened Kelly Wearstler Interior Design, her own design firm. The following year she was introduced to real estate developer Brad Korzen, who hired her to design his house in the Hollywood Hills and several residential properties owned by Korzen's company Kor Realty Group.  The first of the residences was the Avalon hotel in Beverly Hills, which re-opened in 1999 with a style described in the press as "a playful take on mid-century modernism." With apartments filled with pieces from modernist artists such as Arne Jacobsen, Eero Saarinen and George Nelson, The New York Times would write a decade later that "her playful, elegantly over-the-top designs for the Avalon Beverly Hills changed the look of boutique hotels around the world." In 2000, she designed the small Maison 140 hotel in Beverly Hills.

Her work on the Avalon and the Maison 140 led to a commission designing Viceroy Hotels and Resorts, a new chain of boutique hotels, which she gave an "almost theatrical" Hollywood aesthetic.  The Viceroy in Palm Springs became "her most accomplished work" in 2001, and the design of the Viceroy that opened a year later in Santa Monica also earning praise in the press. By that time she was also working on the Viceroy Miami, and other notable designs include Viceroy Anguilla on the island of Anguilla and The Tides Hotel South Beach in Miami. Elle Decor  would later write that "her luxury hotel interiors" featured "elegant bergère chairs, unexpected lacquer finishes (glistening lemon yellows, Amazon parrot greens) and old-style stately wallpapers."  As of 2002 she had also completed design projects for clients such as Mercury Records, Ben Stiller, and Jeanne Tripplehorn. In 2006 Wearstler designed the restaurant and lounge, BG Restaurant, at the Manhattan Bergdorf Goodman department store.

First books and Top Design (2004-2008)

Wearstler published her first book of design in March 2004. Titled Modern Glamour: The Art of Unexpected Style, it was co-written with Jane Bogart and released through Regan Books. Publishers Weekly  wrote that the book's "large, full-bleed color photographs do justice to the variety of [Wearstler's] creations." HarperCollins published Wearstler's Domicilium Decoratus in 2006, a style book featuring photographs of her Beverly Hills mansion and herself dressed in evening gowns. David Colman of the New York Times described it as "a kind of lavish brochure for Ms. Wearstler’s vision (she has a fabric line and has carpet, furniture and china lines in the works), which involves a decadent Hollywood riposte to Martha Stewart’s stolidly tasteful East Coast domesticity."

With filming starting in 2006, she served as one of three primary judges on Top Design, a reality show contest that premiered on Bravo in January 2007. Wearstler appeared in all twenty episodes before the show's end in 2008, and attracted a fair degree of attention in the press with the outfits she wore while judging. The New Yorker wrote in 2009 that "most people, say they watched just for Wearstler’s getups," with The New York Times writing that "Wearstler’s fondness for pastiche in fashion garnered a lot of attention... but those hats aren’t calculated." The latter article quoted Wearstler stating that "sometimes I might look a little crazy, but sometimes beautiful things happen. I don’t take it too seriously.’’ In 2007, she was named to Vogue’s Top Ten Best Dressed list, and also that year TIME named her to its Style & Design 100 list of international creative professionals.

Retail stores and home and fashion lines (2008-2012)
In July 2007 Wearstler opened her first brick and mortar retail space in the form of a boutique in Bergdorf Goodman's home-furnishings department, and the following year her office was based in West Hollywood on La Cienega Boulevard. Also in 2008 she introduced a line of decorative home goods for Bergdorf Goodman, which was sold out of her own retail shop in the store. In late 2008 she started working on a line of jewelry, scarves, bags, and belts, with plans to expand into women's apparel at a later time. By 2009 she had designed the top suite of the Las Vegas Hard Rock Hotel and a home for Stacey Snider of DreamWorks, and was in the process of decorating a large contemporary house for Gwen Stefani and Gavin Rossdale. She released her book Hue in early 2010, which features photography in chapters organized by color. Wrote the Los Angeles Times about the book, "Hollywood glamour, neoclassical ornamentation, pattern and texture prove to be Wearstler signatures, but color, she writes, 'is everything.'" In 2011 she was named to Architectural Digest's AD100 list, which is also dubbed the Top 100 Architecture & Interior Design list. The French version of the publication would also name her to its World's Top Interior Designers list.

By early 2011 KWID had designed rugs for the Rug Company and fine china for Pickard China, and KWID would also for a time continue designing a line of wall treatments for F. Schumacher & Co. and exclusive bed sheets for Sferra. Wearstler announced her own eponymously named fashion line, Kelly Wearstler, in spring 2011. Her first fashion collection was four years in the making, incorporating patterns and design aesthetics seen within Wearstler's interior design work. Booth Moore of the Los Angeles Times said the collection had the "appearance of being handmade or one-of-a-kind, even if not." The Wall Street Journal called her ready-to-wear clothing and jewelry "reflections of her modern, but also classic and opulent, aesthetic," while magazine W described that season's fashion collection as "a bold mix-and-match collection of hand-painted blouses, cropped jackets, full-legged pants, and pouf skirts," as well as "stone-laden metal clutches and sculptural jewels" for accessorizing.

As of July 2011 her home furnishing, clothing and accessories continued to be sold at Bergdorf Goodman, as well as through Neiman Marcus, Holt Renfrew, Net-a-Porter, and her website. Her new fashion collection debuted at those same stores in August 2011, and was shortly afterwards sold through a new flagship boutique she opened on Melrose Avenue on September 1, 2011. David A. Keeps of the Los Angeles Times dubbed the store "a sleek atelier where Art Deco meets 1970s Minimalism and the 1980s Italian style known as Memphis." Her winter 2011 fashion line was sold exclusively by Bergdorf Goodman, and featured ready-to-wear, clutches and jewelry. This debut season was described as having a"feminine sensibility" by Nicole Phelps of Style.com, with Phelps describing Wearstler's spring 2012 line as featuring clashing patterns and a mod-glam look. As of late 2012, Wearstler's home furnishing continued to be available in the Kelly Wearstler Boutique at Bergdorf Goodman.

Rhapsody and recent buildings (2012-2015)
Her fourth book, Rhapsody, came out on October 12, 2012. Wearstler explained that the book is about combining varied textures, scales, and time periods, opining that mixing "antiques, vintage and contemporary design pieces and art" leads to a more "soulful" interior. According to the Los Angeles Times, the book's photography demonstrates how some of her interiors are "kaleidoscopic confections while others have a classical elegance." The review further opined that the book is "Art Deco meets 1980s Italian design," and that it "explores how the worlds of fashion and décor merge." By that time Wearstler had also written monthly advice columns for publications such as Domaine, The Coveteur, InStyle, and The Huffington Post. In May 2014 her work studio in Los Angeles was featured in The New York Times, and in 2015 her Malibu beachfront home was featured in a photoshoot by Elle Decor, with Vogue and In Style following suit. Wallpaper* named her one of its Top 20 Interior Designers in October 2015.

In 2014, Wearstler collaborated with Los Angeles-based confectioner Compartés on a line of chocolates. According to Architectural Digest, both the flavors and Wearstler's "whimsical" packaging are inspired by features and locales of Los Angeles. A second line of flavors debuted in May 2015.

In early 2015 Brad Korzen officially launched Proper Hotels, a hotel chain focused on "creating an environment that is both culturally sound and keeps some elements of the classic grand hotels intact." Wearstler was announced as interior designer for a number of upcoming Proper Hotel properties, including locations in Los Angeles, San Francisco, Santa Monica, Brooklyn, Miami, Napa Valley, and Austin, Texas. Wearstler was also commissioned to design the $800 million renovation for Westfield Century City, a shopping center in Los Angeles. According to the developers, construction will be complete by 2017.

Lifestyle brand (2015-present)
Her clothing is no longer sold at Bergdorf Goodman or related retailers, as Wearstler no longer has a fashion collection, instead focusing on furniture, lighting, textiles and accessories sold at her flagship store and website. She continued to operate her Los Angeles boutique as of July 2015, with Architectural Digest writing at the time that the store "showcases the breadth and daring of her creative output." The store contains antique and modern pieces, as well as home furnishings and jewelry designed by Wearstler.

As of 2015 she was involved in a number of collaborations and designing lamps with the Italian furniture company Kartell. KWID also has ongoing partnerships with The Rug Company, E.J. Victor, and Pickard China, and as of 2015 she designed collections of fabrics, wall coverings, and trims for Lee Jofa, before also being sold at her boutique, website, and other stores. Kelly Wearstler Furniture Collection, described by Elle Decor as her "first comprehensive portfolio of furniture" was released in October 2015.

In March 2016 an "exclusive 'London edit'" of her designs debuted in Harrods, with Wearstler calling the arrangement a "dream come true." Her collection was the first Californian homeware brand to be stocked at the store. Opined Wallpaper*, "all the pieces are imbued with personality. From the brushed copper through to the walnut that coats the inside of the furniture pieces, a particular ardour resides in the wares." In June 2016 Wearstler launched a new bridal registry featuring designer products for the home. Also in June 2016, Elle Decor named her to its A-List of the world's best designers for the second year in a row. In 2016, Wearstler was also the interior designer in charge of remodeling the restaurant Viviane, located in the Avalon Hotel in Beverly Hills. In the same year, she designed a New York home for former Bare Escentuals CEO Leslie Blodgett.

In 2017, Wearstler's Malibu home was photographed for Melanie Acevedo's photobook The Authentics. In September 2017, Wearstler completed the interior design of the first Proper hotel in San Francisco.

In 2018, Wearstler also debuted her first retail project design, a chocolate shop in Los Angeles called Compartés Chocolatier, created in partnership with Jonathan Graham.

In 2019, Wearstler was the first American designer to collaborate with Georg Jensen on a six-piece home accessories collection called "Frequency." In May 2019, Wearstler announced she had designed a new collection of carpets as part of her continuing collaboration with The Rug Company. In June 2019, Wearstler launched a new line of wallpaper designs. The Santa Monica Proper Hotel with an interior designed by Wearstler also opened in July 2019. In December 2019, Wearstler debuted her new furniture collection for 2020.

In 2020, Wearstler's Beverly Hills home was featured in The New York Times and In Residence.

The Austin Proper Hotel designed by Wearstler opened in February 2020. The Downtown L.A. Proper hotel also designed by Wearstler is now slated to open in June 2021.

In 2020, Wearstler overhauled a house on Malibu's Broad Beach that was believed to have been built by Frank A. Garbutt, co-founder of Famous Players-Lasky, which later became Paramount Pictures. At one point, the house was also owned by Carroll O’Connor.

In March 2020, Wearstler became the first instructor to teach the interior design course on the MasterClass platform. In 2021, Wearstler collaborated with Farrow & Ball to create her own collection of signature paint hues inspired by the state of California, called the California Collection.

In March 2021, Wearstler also designed a virtual garage to commemorate the launch of GMC's Hummer EV, which she said was imagined for LeBron James.

In 2021, Wearstler invested in the company Block Renovation, which provides a technology based platform that helps homeowners and contractors to digitize and simplify the home renovation process. In early 2022, she became an investor and partner of the female-founded tequila brand Casa Del Sol, which was co-founded by actor Eva Longoria. In June 2022, Wearstler also became an angel investor in the startup Vergo, a Fintech company that caters to the architecture, design and building industry.

In 2022, Wearstler took over Wallpaper magazine as a guest editor for their October 2022 issue. The magazine also did a special 20 page feature on her studio’s design work and evolution. In the same year, she partnered with Amazon on their Amazon Influencer Program where her products will be available on her Amazon Storefront.

Inspired by the strides in LED technology, Wearstler in 2022 designed a new line of designer lighting for Visual Comfort called Tech Lighting.

Style and impact
Wearstler has described her own design work, particularly her interior design for hotels, as "romantic" in style. Elle Decor wrote around 2015 that "Wearstler encapsulates contemporary sophistication and wit, with a nod to the past and a wink at the future. The mix is altogether her own and is tailored to every job."

In 2019, the Financial Times described her as "the woman who brought West Coast style to the world." In 2020, Domino Mag said her toolbox of trademarks included "peacock green and brass, painterly geometric prints, warm marble, slick lacquer, standout vintage from Ettore Sottsass to Tobia Scarpa, and—always—the earthy naturalism of her West Coast home."

With a style periodically described as maximalism, she has been one of several designers credited with bringing "the decorative back to interior design" and mixing modern and historical designs. The New Yorker opined that since the late 1990s, "her style has evolved from mid-century modern to glammed-up Hollywood Regency to an ornate, layered look inspired in part by the late Hollywood set decorator and interior designer Tony Duquette. She uses intense colors, David Hicks-like graphic patterning, and contrasting textures (lacquer, parchment, shagreen)."

In 2009 Dana Goodyear of The New Yorker dubbed Wearstler "the presiding grande dame of West Coast interior design," explaining that "Wearstler represents the uninhibited side of Los Angeles, the part that celebrates how far the city is from strict East Coast notions of good taste." Mayer Rus, the design and culture editor for Los Angeles Times Magazine, stated that "I think for many people around the world Kelly's work exemplifies this fantasy of beautiful sun-baked life, glamour in California. Kelly's genius is her ability to mix elements from all different eras, styles and periods. There's a certain bravery in what she does that flirts with going over-the-top, but always stands just back from the edge."

In 2022, Wearstler partnered with UT School of Architecture’s Interior Design program, to establish the Kelly Wearstler Endowed Fund for Design Students to provide undergraduate scholarships and graduate fellowships to design students who require financial aid.

Influences and methods
Kelly draws inspiration from many different areas of design, including fashion, architecture, graphic design, landscape design, art, and jewelry.

Wearstler credits Peggy Guggenheim and Doris Duke as being her style icons. As an interior designer, Wearstler finds influence in Modernism and old Hollywood glamour as created by Dorothy Draper and William Haines. Jacque Grange is cited as her favorite designer, in part for "the way he puts things from different periods together so beautifully," and she also names David Hicks, Mark Rothko, Ettore Sottsass, Misha Kahn, and Piero Fornasetti as among her aesthetic influences. She has furthermore cited the work of architect Aldo Rossi as an influence, as well as artists Victor Vasarely, Sheila Hicks and Yaacov Agam. Wearstler visits auction houses to collect furniture and decor for projects, as well as designing her own. She believes clutter to be a big faux pas in home decor, as well as "somebody buying all their furniture from one place. The result just looks flat; it has no depth or dimensions, like a showroom." She has also criticized the trend of "too much oversized furniture," explaining that "to create a successful design you need to play with different scales."

Wearstler has collaborated with several emerging designers to bring more eclecticism to her projects. 

In 2021, Wearstler launched The Gallery, a curated eCommerce page on her website that promotes the products from emerging and established artists that she admires. As of October 2022, she has partnered with Hagit Pincovici, Dirk van der Kooij, Morgan Peck, Rotganzen, and Felix Muhrhofer.

Personal life
Wearstler and her husband, Brad Korzen, married in 2002 and have three sons. The family has remodeled and sold a number of houses in Southern California, including the former Beverly Hills estate of film producer Albert Broccoli, which they moved into and renovated in 2007. Continuing to work primarily out of Los Angeles, as of 2015, Wearstler and Korzen maintained homes in both Malibu and Beverly Hills. Wearstler is active on social media, and in early 2014, Architectural Digest included her on a list of 15 Must-Follow Designers and Architects on Instagram. The Telegraph also noted her Instagram account as "must follow."

Recognition

Bibliography

Filmography

Further reading

 July 30, 2006.

References

External links
KellyWearstler.com

1967 births
American interior designers
Living people
1990s Playboy Playmates
People from Myrtle Beach, South Carolina
Participants in American reality television series
American women interior designers
21st-century American women